Kozara National Park is a national park in Bosnia and Herzegovina that was proclaimed a protected national forest in 1967 by Josip Broz Tito. It is situated between the rivers Una, Sava, Sana and Vrbas, in the Republika Srpska entity of Bosnia and Herzegovina. These 33.75 square kilometers of dense forest and hilly meadows have earned the nickname 'Green Beauty of Krajina'.

Kozara is a popular hunting ground, with a large 180 square kilometers area of the park open to regulated hunting of deer, pheasants, foxes, boars, hares, and ducks.

A smaller part of the park is designated for nature lovers. Walking, hiking, biking and herb picking are among the many activities in Kozara.

Kozara was also a former battleground during World War II. The Partisans intimate knowledge of Bosnia's rough terrain gave them an advantage over the newly occupying Nazi Germans.

See also 
List of mountains in Bosnia and Herzegovina
List of national parks of Bosnia and Herzegovina

References

External links
 www.npkozara.com

National parks of Bosnia and Herzegovina
Protected areas established in 1967
Protected areas of Bosnia and Herzegovina
Tourist attractions in Bosnia and Herzegovina
Tourism in Bosnia and Herzegovina
Environment of Bosnia and Herzegovina
Nature conservation in Bosnia and Herzegovina
Geography of Bosnia and Herzegovina
Dubica, Bosnia and Herzegovina
IUCN Category II